Carson Ebanks (born 25 February 1956) is a Caymanian sailor. He competed at the 1984 Summer Olympics and the 1996 Summer Olympics.

References

External links
 

1956 births
Living people
Caymanian male sailors (sport)
Olympic sailors of the Cayman Islands
Sailors at the 1984 Summer Olympics – 470
Sailors at the 1996 Summer Olympics – Star
Place of birth missing (living people)